Gabriel Konertz (26 August 1954 – 28 February 2017) was a German rower. He competed in the men's coxless four event at the 1976 Summer Olympics.

References

1954 births
2017 deaths
German male rowers
Olympic rowers of West Germany
Rowers at the 1976 Summer Olympics
Sportspeople from Bonn